The Autovía A-382 is a local autovía in Andalusia, Spain. It is 27 km (16.8 miles) long and runs from the Autopista AP-4 at Jerez de la Frontera to Arcos de la Frontera. It was originally part of the N-342 road.

References

Autopistas and autovías in Spain
Transport in Andalusia